Tonyahaber is a Turkish monthly newspaper founded and continuously published in Tonya since 1999.

Newspapers published in Turkey